Limmer is a surname. Notable people with the surname include:

Lou Limmer (1925–2007), Major League Baseball player
Franz Limmer (1808–1857), Austrian composer
Francis E. Limmer, mayor of Flint, Michigan, 1970–1973

Places
Limmer, Hanover, a quarter of Hanover, Germany